Emmo, a diminutive of a Germanic masculine given name, may refer to:
Emmo, Count of Hesbaye (d. aft. 982)
Emmo of Loon (d. 1078), count

See also
Ehrenfried (name)
Immo (disambiguation)